Helen Fraser (born Helen Margaret Stronach; born 15 June 1942) is an English actress, who has appeared in many television series since the early 1960s. For international audiences, she may be best known for her roles in  Billy Liar (1963) and Repulsion (1965). She is also well known in Britain for portraying the role of miserable warder Sylvia Hollamby in the prison drama series Bad Girls. She appeared in the series from the first episode in 1999 until the last in 2006.

Career
She trained at the Royal Academy of Dramatic Art alongside Tom Courtenay and John Thaw, among others. She gained her breakthrough role alongside Courtenay in Billy Liar (1963). They later played the parents of character Dave Best in the Christmas special of The Royle Family (2008).

She is best known to television viewers for her long-running role in the ITV women's prison drama Bad Girls as unpleasant prison officer Sylvia Hollamby from the first episode in 1999 to the last in 2006. She reprised the role in the West End production of Bad Girls: The Musical in 2007.

She made her TV debut in the early 1960s and her credits include Z-Cars, Dixon of Dock Green, The Likely Lads, Doctor in the House, The Dustbinmen, On the Buses, Rising Damp, Tales of the Unexpected, Duty Free, One Foot in the Grave and Casualty. She also worked on TV with comedians like Dick Emery and the Two Ronnies in the 1970s.

She has also appeared on stage, including with the Royal National Theatre, in the West End and in regional theatres across the country. In 2009 and 2010, she toured the UK as Mrs Fisher in a stage version of Billy Liar. In 2011, she joined the tour of Calendar Girls.

Fraser has appeared in the ITV soap Coronation Street twice – in 1998 as Magenta Savannah and again in 2013 as Doris Babbage.

In 2015, she appeared in an episode of the BBC daytime soap Doctors.

Personal life
In 1964, she married the recording engineer Peter Handford, the couple had met on the set of Billy Liar. Handford died in 2007. Fraser lives in Eye, Suffolk.

Filmography

References

External links

Image & voice sample

1942 births
Living people
Alumni of RADA
English stage actresses
English film actresses
English television actresses
Actresses from Oldham
People from Eye, Suffolk
Actresses from Suffolk
20th-century English actresses
21st-century English actresses
English soap opera actresses